The Tulua people   were an Aboriginal Australian people of Queensland, in the southern to central region from the coast to the ranges. The Dappil and Tulua people possibly spoke the same language.

Language

The language of the Tulua people is related to Dappil.

Country
The Tulua's tribal lands ranged over an estimated . They extended from the Calliope River to Port Curtis, near Gladstone. They ran inland from the coast as the nearby ranges and the Boyne Rivers's watershed, and took in also the area around Many Peaks.

The Dappil and Tulua people possibly spoke the same language.

History of contact
When Tulua country was occupied by white settlers in 1854, it was estimated that the Tulua numbered around 700 people. In less than 3 decades (1882) they were reduced to a mere 43 people. One white informant attributed the drastic drop in their demographics to the impact of dropsy

Alternative names
 Toolooa
 Dandan (an autonym fromdan = man)
 ?Narung

Notes

Citations

Sources

Aboriginal peoples of Queensland